The 1996 Monte Carlo Rally was the 63rd Rallye Automobile de Monte-Carlo. It was won by Patrick Bernardini.

As it was not part of the  World Rally Championship, it was instead held as the first round of the 2-Litre World Championship.

Entry list

Results

References

External links 

Monte Carlo Rally
1996 in Monégasque sport
1996 in French motorsport